Mini-Europe is a miniature park located in the Bruparck entertainment park, at the foot of the Atomium, in Brussels, Belgium. Mini-Europe has reproductions of monuments in the European Union and other countries within the continent of Europe on display, at a scale of 1:25. Roughly 80 cities and 350 buildings are represented. Mini-Europe receives 350,000 visitors per year and has a turnover of €4 million.

The park contains live action models such as trains, mills, an erupting Mount Vesuvius, and cable cars. A guide gives the details on all the monuments. At the end of the visit, the Spirit of Europe exhibition gives an interactive overview of the EU in the form of multimedia games.

The initial investment was of €10 million in 1989, on its inauguration by then-Prince Philip of Belgium.

Exhibits

Building the monuments

The monuments exposed are chosen for the quality of their architecture or their European symbolism. Most of the monuments were made using moulds. The final copy used to be cast from epoxy resin, but nowadays polyester is used. Three of the monuments were made out of stone (e.g. the Leaning Tower of Pisa, in marble). A computer-assisted milling procedure was used for two of the models. After painting, the monuments are installed on site, together with decorations and lighting.

Many of the monuments were financed by European countries or regions. The Brussels Grand-Place model cost €350,000 to make. The Cathedral of Santiago de Compostela required more than 24,000 hours of work.

Gardens
Ground cover plants, dwarf trees, bonsais and grafted trees are used alongside miniature monuments, and the paths are adorned with bushes and flowers.

List of models

Austria
Melk Abbey

Belgium
Grand-Place / City Hall, Brussels
The Belfry, Bruges
Town Hall, Leuven
Castle of Vêves, Celles
Citadel and Notre-Dame Church, Dinant
Berlaymont building, Brussels
Graslei street and the Rabot, Ghent
Alden Biesen Castle, Rijkhoven
Main square of Antwerp (City Hall, Brabo statue, guild houses)
Curtius House, Liège

Bulgaria
Rila Monastery, Rila Mountain, part of the UNESCO World Heritage

Croatia
St. Mark's Church, Zagreb

Cyprus
Ancient Greek theatre, Kourion

Czech Republic
 Prague Orloj

Denmark
Viking ring fort
Nyhavn waterfront, Copenhagen
Børsen (old stock exchange), Copenhagen

Estonia
Great Coastal Gate and Fat Margaret Tower, Tallinn

Finland
St. Olaf's Castle, Savonlinna

France
Eiffel Tower, Paris
Arc de Triomphe, Paris
Basilica of the Sacré Cœur, Paris
Centre Georges Pompidou, Paris
Notre Dame du Haut, Ronchamp
Clos Vougeot, near Dijon
Château de Chenonceau, Loire Valley
Royal Saltworks, Arc-et-Senans

Germany
Speyer Cathedral
Eltz Castle
Holstentor, Burgtor and Salzspeicher, Lübeck
Brandenburg Gate and Berlin Wall, Berlin
Bonngasse (street) with Beethoven's birth house, Bonn
Wies Pilgrimage Church
Porta Nigra, Trier
Osthofentor, Soest
Jahrtausendturm, Magdeburg

Greece
Acropolis, Athens
Traditional village, Santorini

Hungary
Széchenyi Bath

Ireland
Glendalough monastery, County Wicklow
Rock of Cashel, County Tipperary
Gallarus Oratory, County Kerry

Italy
Piazza dei Miracoli (Leaning Tower, Duomo, Baptistry), Pisa
Trevi Fountain, Rome
Doge's Palace and St Mark's Campanile, Venice
Palazzo Pubblico, Siena
Villa Capra (La Rotonda), Vicenza
Trulli of Alberobello
Mount Vesuvius

Latvia
Freedom Monument, Riga

Lithuania
Vilnius University campus, Vilnius

Luxembourg
Adolphe Bridge, Luxembourg City

Malta
Mnajdra temple

Netherlands
Mint Tower and Montelbaan Tower, Amsterdam
Town Hall, Maastricht
Hoensbroek Castle, Hoensbroek
Church and houses, Ootmarsum
Abbey and Kloveniersdoelen, Middelburg
Museum village of Orvelte
Weigh House and Tax Tower, Alkmaar
Windmills, Kinderdijk
Hoofdtoren and Oude Doelenkade street, Hoorn
Town Hall, Veere

Poland
Artus Court, Gdańsk
Monument to Fallen Shipyard Workers, Gdańsk

Portugal
Belém Tower, Lisbon
Castle of Guimarães
Ribeira, Porto
Traditional village of the Algarve
Oceanarium, Lisbon

Romania
Mogoșoaia Palace, near Bucharest

Slovakia
The Blue Church in Bratislava

Slovenia
Prešeren Square with Tromostovje in Ljubljana

Spain
Cathedral of Santiago de Compostela
El Escorial
Plaza de Toros, Seville
Christopher Columbus monument, Barcelona
Landscape with windmills, La Mancha

Sweden
City Hall, Stockholm

Ukraine
Independence Monument, Kyiv

United Kingdom
Houses of Parliament / Big Ben, London
Stratford-upon-Avon (Shakespeare's birth house, Anne Hathaway's cottage, etc.)
Longleat House, Wiltshire
Royal Crescent and Circus, Bath
Dover Castle
Arlington Row, Bibury

Other
Ariane 5
Pride of Dover ferry
An airport
A Ferris wheel
A North Sea oil platform
TGV train
Calypso (Jacques Cousteau's ship)

See also
 Madurodam — Model village in Netherlands containing miniature famous Dutch landmarks
 Catalunya en Miniatura — miniature park located 17 km away from Barcelona, with an exhibition area of 35.000 m2 including all major buildings of Catalonia and of Antoni Gaudí
 Italia in miniatura — miniature park near Rimini
 Bekonscot — typical English village in miniature
 Huis ten Bosch — Japanese theme park modelled on the cities and landscape of the Low Countries
 Minimundus miniature park in Klagenfurt, Austria.

External links

 Mini-Europe official website
 Mini-Europe in Brussels

References

Buildings and structures in Brussels
Culture in Brussels
Miniature parks
Scale modeling
Tourist attractions in Brussels